The first coin collector is said to have been Augustus. During the Renaissance, it became a fad among some members of the privileged classes, especially kings and queens.

A coin collector is different from a numismatist, which is someone who studies coins. Many collectors are also numismatists, but some are not. Likewise, not all numismatists collect coins themselves.

See also
List of numismatists

References

Coin collectors
Coin collecting